1900 is a Dutch bi-monthly sports magazine published in Amsterdam, focusing on the association football club AFC Ajax. It was founded in 2012 with its first edition appearing on 20 December 2012.

History
1900 magazine was created in 2012 by AFC Ajax N.V. and Blue Flower Media to provide a bi-monthly journal surrounding the Dutch association football club AFC Ajax from Amsterdam. The name of the magazine is derived from the founding year of the club, which was first officially registered on 18 March 1900. The first issue appeared on 20 December 2012 and had former Ajax player and head coach at the time Frank de Boer on the cover. The Chief-Editor of the magazine is Joost De Jong, who had previously been an editor for AD Sportwereld, and the editor in chief for NLCOACH.

People on the cover

Staff

Editors
Jan Cees Butter (2012–present)
Maarten Dekker (2012–present)
David Endt (2012–present)
Sander van Hal (2013–present)
Robert Heukels (2012–present)
Mark van den Heuvel (2013–present)
Joost de Jong (2012–present)
Dominic King (2013–present)
Nik Kok (2012–present)
Hein de Kort (2012–present)
Ronald Kres (2013–present)
Diana Kuip (2013–present)
Menno Pot (2013–present)
Martijn Reijnink (2012–present)
Eric Verweij (2012–present)
Rob Willemse (2012–present)
Martin van Zaanen (2013–present)

Chief-editors

See also
AFC Ajax
Ajax Magazine
Ajax-nieuws

References

External links

2012 establishments in the Netherlands
AFC Ajax
Association football magazines
Bi-monthly magazines published in the Netherlands
Sports magazines published in the Netherlands
Dutch-language magazines
Magazines established in 2012
Magazines published in Amsterdam